John Epton Searby (1 November 1900 – 12 October 1956) was an English cricketer. Born at Croft, Lincolnshire, Searby was a right-handed batsman.

Searby made his debut in minor counties cricket for Lincolnshire against Staffordshire in the 1924 Minor Counties Championship. He played minor counties cricket for Lincolnshire from 1924 to 1935, making fifty appearances. In 1927 he appeared in a single first-class match, having been selected for an East of England cricket team against the touring New Zealanders at Wisbech Cricket Club Ground. In a match which the New Zealanders won by eight wickets, Searby opened the batting and was dismissed in the East's first-innings by Tom Lowry for 10 runs, while in their second-innings he was dismissed for 7 runs by Herb McGirr.

He died at the village of his birth on 12 October 1956. His brother also played minor counties cricket for Lincolnshire.

References

External links
John Searby at ESPNcricinfo
John Searby at CricketArchive

1900 births
1956 deaths
People from East Lindsey District
English cricketers
Lincolnshire cricketers
East of England cricketers